Baghmara (IPA: ˌbægˈmɑ:rə) is the headquarters of South Garo Hills district in the state of Meghalaya in India. The place is bordered by Bangladesh and is about 113 km from Tura; 248 km from Guwahati; and 287 km from state capital Shillong. It has the famous river, Someshwari, also known as Simsang in Garo tribal language, flowing through its expanse and is also covered in hills and tracts along the way. This southern part of the Garo Hills region has lots of tourist spots compared to other districts and is a popular tourist destination for both domestic and international tourists when it comes to tourism in Western Meghalaya.

The famous Siju Cave is about 45 km away and to get to Siju one needs to go through Baghmara. The famous Balphakram National Park is 66 km away and one needs to pass through this town to get there. The modes of transport is limited to buses and jeeps. This place is famous for its tasty fish and has a historical sea trading connection with Bangladesh. It is also a native place of the first Chief Minister of Meghalaya Captain Williamson Sangma and he always represented Baghmara constituency.
This place is home to the carnivorous pitcher plant and has the Pitcher plant sanctuary located at Dilsa Hill colony of Baghmara

History

The name “Baghmara" derived from the fight that took place between Bong Lasker and a wild Bengal tiger where he killed the tiger by crushing the jaws. Hence, the name Baghmara, where, bagh means "tiger" and mara means "died". To remember Bong Lasker, a tomb was built in the heart of Baghmara town. This place was previously known as "Barokar", which means 12 streams. Here " Baro" or "বারো" meaning 12 is also a বাংলা word and "kar" or কার meaning stream in Bangla.

Demographics
 India census, Baghmara had a population of 8643. Males constitute 53% of the population and females 47%. Baghmara has an average literacy rate of 70%, higher than the national average of 59.5%; with 55% of the males and 45% of females literate. 16% of the population is under 6 years of age. AS per 2011 Census of India, the population of Baghmara municipality has increased to 13,131 persons.

Localities 
Baghmara is the headquarters of Baghmara block in South Garo Hills district. Populated places within the block include:

 Malikona
 Bolsalgre
 Rangdokram
 Konagittim
 Bolsal A·ding
 A·sim Chiring
 Do·pa Grang

References
3. https://www.incredibleindia.org/content/incredibleindia/en/destinations/baghmara.html

External links

 https://www.incredibleindia.org/content/incredibleindia/en/destinations/baghmara.html

Geography of Meghalaya
Cities and towns in South Garo Hills district